Trox atrox is a beetle of the family Trogidae.

References 

atrox
Beetles described in 1854